The 1906–07 season was the 13th in the history of Southern League. Fulham won Division One for the second time in a row and were elected to the Football League. No other teams were applied for election to the Football League. Southend United won Division Two, but there was no promotion or relegation between the divisions.

Division One

A total of 20 teams contest the division, including 18 sides from previous season and two teams promoted from Division Two.

Teams promoted from 1905–06 Division Two:
 Crystal Palace
 Leyton

Division Two

A total of 12 teams contest the division, including 8 sides from previous season and four new teams, all of them are newly elected teams.

Newly elected teams:
 Tunbridge Wells Rangers - transferred from Kent League
 Southend United
 Salisbury City
 Royal Engineers Aldershot

Football League elections
Only one Southern League club, Fulham, applied for election to Division Two of the Football League. They offered midland clubs £15 and northern clubs £20 in expenses for travelling to London and were successful, topping the ballot, and replaced Burton United in the League.

References

1906-07
1906–07 in English association football leagues